Daniel Swärd (also spelled Svärd, born 22 February 1990) is a Swedish footballer who plays as a forward for FC Linköping City.

Swärd was born in Ljungsbro, Sweden, and played youth football with local team BK Ljungsbro, and in the early teens he established himself in Linköpings FF before joining Åtvidabergs FF in Superettan in 2009.

In his first year with Åtvidabergs FF the team ended up in second place and earned promotion to Allsvenskan, the Swedish top tier. The spell in Allsvenskan lasted for one season, before the team got relegated back to Superettan, but before relegation Swärd earned his first cap in the Swedish top division.

Swärd stayed in Åtvidabergs FF for a total of three seasons, making 21 appearances and scoring two goals, before moving to Motala AIF in Division 2 (Swedish fourth tier) for the 2012 season. Before 2015 season, after three years in Motala AIF (last season in Division 1), Svärd made the decision to move back to Linköping and Division 2 to play for FC Linköping City in their ambition of becoming an elite team.

Career statistics

References

External links 
  
  
 

1990 births
Åtvidabergs FF players
Association football forwards
Allsvenskan players
Superettan players
Swedish footballers
Living people
FC Linköping City players